The Volontaires de Saxe (also known as Volontaires du Maréchal de Saxe) were a military unit of cavalry troops recruited by French field marshal Maurice de Saxe. It consisted of dragoons and uhlans (lancers). The troops were organised and dressed according to the taste and ideas of the field marshal. A troops of lancers, composed of black men, guarded the Château de Chambord, his residence.  

The corps fought in the War of the Austrian Succession (1740–1748) and in the Seven Years' War (1756–1763).

Sources 
 Henri, comte de La Bassetière: Maurice de Saxe et ses Uhlands (1748-1750), dans Loire-et Cher historique, 15 mai 1893 (pp. 130-139) et 15 juin 1893 (pp. 162-178) (Bibl. de l’Institut catholique de Paris); nach: André Corvisier, L'armée française de la fin du XVIIe siècle au ministère de Choiseul, tome I, Paris 1964
 Liliane und Fred Funcken, Historische Uniformen, Bd. 2, München 1978

Military history of Poland
Cavalry units and formations of France